Helmut Brunner  (born 14 September 1954 in Kötzting) is a German politician, representative of the Christian Social Union of Bavaria. He became a member of the Landtag of Bavaria in 1994.

See also
List of Bavarian Christian Social Union politicians

References

Ministers of the Bavaria State Government
Christian Social Union in Bavaria politicians
1954 births
Living people
People from Bad Kötzting